Tilemsi is a commune of the Cercle of Goundam in the Tombouctou Region of Mali. The seat lies at Kel Malha. In the 2009 census the commune had a population of 7,296.

References

External links
.

Communes of Tombouctou Region